The  is a rapid transit electric multiple unit (EMU) train type operated by the Transportation Bureau City of Nagoya on the Nagoya Subway Higashiyama Line in Japan since 1992.

Specifications
Like other modern cars on the Nagoya Subway lines, the 5050 series uses a variable-frequency drive controller to convert DC current to AC current to power a squirrel cage motor.

Formation
, the fleet consists of 27 six-car sets, formed as follows.

(Left is toward Fujigaoka Station and right is toward Takabata Station)

One car is designated as a "women-only car" during the morning and evening peak periods on weekdays as a measure to reduce sexual assault during crowded times.

Special liveries 
As of 1 August 2022, set 5177 was wrapped in a yellow livery for the "Yellow Den Memorial" campaign to mark 100th anniversary of the Nagoya Municipal Subway. The campaign is scheduled to run until January 2023.

References

External links

 Nagoya Transportation Bureau's technical details about the 5050 series 
 Nagoya Transportation Bureau's guide to the 5050 series 
 Nippon Sharyo information 

Electric multiple units of Japan
5050 series
Train-related introductions in 1992
600 V DC multiple units
Nippon Sharyo multiple units